Central Luzon Adventist Academy (CLAA) is a Seventh-day Adventist secondary school located in Sitio Bucaran, Barangay Bodega, Floridablanca, Pampanga, Philippines.  The school is affiliated with the Seventh-day Adventist Church and traces its beginnings from mission-oriented people who had a strong desire to develop young people for usefulness in life, and Christian service.

CLAA is part of the worldwide Adventist education system with headquarters at the General Conference of Seventh-day Adventists, Silver Spring, Maryland, USA.

It is a part of the Seventh-day Adventist education system, the world's second largest Christian school system.

Spiritual aspects
All students take religion classes each year that they are enrolled. These classes cover topics in biblical history and Christian and denominational doctrines. Instructors in other disciplines also begin each class period with prayer or a short devotional thought, many which encourage student input. Weekly, the entire student body gathers together for an hour-long chapel service.

Outside the classrooms there is year-round spiritually oriented programming that relies on student involvement.

Athletics
The school offer the following  sports:
Soccer (boys & girls)
Basketball
Badminton
Softball
Tennis
Volleyball

See also

 Seventh-day Adventist education
 Seventh-day Adventist Church
 Seventh-day Adventist theology
 History of the Seventh-day Adventist Church
List of Seventh-day Adventist colleges and universities

Notes

References

External links
https://web.archive.org/web/20140516211353/http://adventist.ph/

Adventist secondary schools in the Philippines
Schools in Pampanga
Protestant schools in the Philippines